Domnall Ua Bécda was Bishop of Killala from 29 March 1199 to 1206.

References

12th-century Roman Catholic bishops in Ireland
13th-century Roman Catholic bishops in Ireland
Bishops of Killala